Pedro Rivera may refer to:

 Pedro N. Rivera (born 1945), retired U.S. Air Force officer
 Pedro Rivera (footballer) (born 1976), Chilean footballer
 Pedro Ignacio Rivera (1759–1833), Bolivian-born statesman and lawyer
 Pedro Rivera (educator), former Pennsylvania Secretary of Education